Avraham Ravitz (13 January 1934 – 26 January 2009) was an Israeli politician and member of the Knesset for Degel HaTorah, which forms part of the United Torah Judaism alliance.

Biography
Avraham Ravitz was born in Tel Aviv during the Mandate era. He studied at Hebron Rabbinical College, served in the Lehi, and later in the IDF. Ravitz was married to Avigayil, with whom he had 12 children. He lived in the Bayit VeGan neighborhood of Jerusalem. In January 2009, he was hospitalized at Hadassah Ein Kerem Hospital in Jerusalem due to heart problems. He died on January 26, 2009.

Political career
Ravitz was first elected to the Knesset in 1988, and in June 1990, he was appointed Deputy Minister of Housing and Construction. Although he lost his seat in the 1992 elections, Yitzhak Peretz resigned three days into the new Knesset term, and Ravitz replaced him. He retained his seat in elections in 1996 and 1999. When Ariel Sharon formed a new government in 2001, Ravitz was appointed Deputy Minister of Education. He was re-elected in 2003, and in March 2005, he was appointed Deputy Minister of Welfare and Social Services. He retained his seat again in the 2006 election.

In November 2008, Ravitz announced that he was leaving politics, although he planned to continue to serve as Degel HaTorah chairman.

References

External links
My Shabbat dinner with Rabbi Avraham Ravitz, Gideon Levy, Haaretz
 

1934 births
2009 deaths
Betar members
Degel HaTorah politicians
Deputy ministers of Israel
Deputy Speakers of the Knesset
Haredi rabbis in Israel
Jewish Israeli politicians
Jews in Mandatory Palestine
Members of the 12th Knesset (1988–1992)
Members of the 13th Knesset (1992–1996)
Members of the 14th Knesset (1996–1999)
Members of the 15th Knesset (1999–2003)
Members of the 16th Knesset (2003–2006)
Members of the 17th Knesset (2006–2009)
Politicians from Tel Aviv
Rabbinic members of the Knesset
United Torah Judaism politicians